Sega Saturn Magazine was a monthly magazine from England covering the Sega Saturn, a home video game console. It held the official Saturn magazine license for the UK, and some issues included a demo CD created by Sega, Sega Flash, which included playable games and game footage. In 1997, the magazine reported a readership of 30,140. The last issue, 37, was published in November 1998.

History 
Sega Saturn Magazine was originally known as Sega Magazine, which launched in 1994 and covered the Sega consoles available at the time, including the Master System, Mega Drive, Mega-CD, 32X and Game Gear. In November 1995, it was relaunched as Sega Saturn Magazine and coverage of other Sega consoles was gradually reduced.

In addition to reviews, previews, and demo discs, the magazine included interviews with developers about topics such as the development libraries that Sega was providing them with, and would routinely cover topics of interest only to hardcore gamers such as imported Japanese RPGs and beat 'em ups. The magazine retained its title even after its content became chiefly devoted to the Saturn's successor, the Dreamcast, as the Saturn had been discontinued in Europe.

References

External links
 Retromags.com - Sega Saturn Magazine Contents (Wayback Machine copy)
SegaSaturn.co.uk - Interview with SSM editor Richard Leadbetter
SegaFans Archive of Sega Saturn Magazine (Wayback Machine copy)
Archived Sega Saturn Magazines on the Wayback Machine 
Sega Magazine Archive on Sega Retro

1994 establishments in the United Kingdom
1998 disestablishments in the United Kingdom
Defunct computer magazines published in the United Kingdom
Golden Joystick Award winners
Magazines established in 1994
Magazines disestablished in 1998
Magazines published in London
Monthly magazines published in the United Kingdom
Sega magazines
Sega Saturn
Video game magazines published in the United Kingdom